Jameson Jahan Wang (born July 30, 2001) is an American football quarterback for the Cornell Big Red. He played high school football at Oaks Christian School in Westlake Village, California. Wang is the first Cornell freshman to throw and run for a touchdown in the same game.

Early life and high school career
Jameson Wang was born on July 30, 2001, in Los Angeles, California. Wang, who is of Asian descent, attended Harvard-Westlake School in Los Angeles and transferred to Oaks Christian School in Westlake Village, California, for his last year of high school football.

A three-star recruit, Wang originally committed to the United States Air Force Academy to play college football on February 5, 2020. He enrolled in the United States Air Force Academy Preparatory School, before announcing he would be transferring to Cornell University on August 21, 2021.

Statistics

College career

Freshman year
Wang made his college debut for Cornell on October 9, 2021 against the Harvard Crimson. Wang had three carries for 13 yards and became the first freshman to earn time at quarterback for the Big Red since 2014. The next week, he helped the Big Red earn their first win of the season against the Colgate Raiders, and received the Ivy League Rookie of the Week honor after his performance. Wang became the first Big Red quarterback to surpass 100 rushing yards in a game since 2009 after his performance against the Brown Bears, after recording 121 passing yards and 2 touchdowns, while also rushing for 101 yards and a touchdown.

Sophomore year

Statistics

References

External links
 Cornell Big Red bio
 
 

2001 births
Living people
Players of American football from California
American football quarterbacks
Cornell Big Red football players